Thirukampuliyur Ranga Ramachandran (9 January 1917 – 30 November 1990) was an Indian actor and comedian who acted mainly in Tamil films. He was cast mostly in lead or supportive roles, especially in comical parts, from the 1940s to the 1960s. Known for his distinctive saucer-eyes, Ramachandran was known as "The Eddie Cantor of India".

Early life
Thirukampuliyur Ranga Ramachandran born in Tirukampuliyur in Tiruchi district. He was born in to a Madhwa Brahmin family. As a child, he had no interest in studies and played truant from school.

Partial filmography

Discography

Notes 

1990 deaths
Tamil comedians
1917 births
20th-century comedians
Madhva Brahmins